NeuroMolecular Medicine is a quarterly peer-reviewed medical journal covering research on the molecular and biochemical basis of neurological disorders. It is published by Springer Science+Business Media and the editors-in-chief are Thiruma V. Arumugam (La Trobe University) and Raghu Vemuganti (University of Wisconsin).

Abstracting and indexing 
The journal is abstracted and indexed in:

According to the Journal Citation Reports, the journal has a 2020 impact factor of 3.8.

References

External links 
 

Springer Science+Business Media academic journals
English-language journals
Neurology journals
Quarterly journals
Publications established in 2002